Liopasia is a genus of moths of the family Crambidae.

Species
Liopasia andrealis Dognin, 1910
Liopasia anolopha Munroe, 1963
Liopasia apicenotata Hampson, 1918
Liopasia dorsalis Hampson, 1899
Liopasia leucoperalis Hampson, 1918
Liopasia maculifimbria Dyar, 1914
Liopasia meridionalis Schaus, 1920
Liopasia ochracealis (Walker, 1866)
Liopasia purpurealis Schaus, 1924
Liopasia puseyalis Schaus, 1920
Liopasia reliqualis Möschler, 1882
Liopasia rufalis Hampson, 1913
Liopasia simplicissimalis Dyar, 1914
Liopasia surinamalis Schaus, 1920
Liopasia teneralis (Lederer, 1863)

References

Spilomelinae
Crambidae genera
Taxa named by Heinrich Benno Möschler